Ptychosema is a genus of flowering plants in the legume family, Fabaceae.  It belongs to the subfamily Faboideae.

Species
Ptychosema comprises the following species:
 Ptychosema anomalum F.Muell.
 Ptychosema pusillum Lindl.

Species names with uncertain taxonomic status
The status of the following species is unresolved:
 Ptychosema trifoliatum F. Muell.

References

Mirbelioids
Fabaceae genera